"So Long Pal" is a 1944 song by Al Dexter and His Troopers. The song was the follow-up to Al Dexter's two-sided hit, "Pistol Packin' Mama"/"Rosalita". It was recorded on March 18, 1942, along with "Rosalita" and the b-side "Too Late to Worry, Too Blue to Cry". "So Long Pal" stayed at the number one position on the Folk Juke Box chart for thirteen weeks in 1944.  The B-side would also hit number one on the same chart.

References

1942 songs
1944 singles
Songs written by Al Dexter